Beemer may refer to:

Places
Beemer, Nebraska, a village
Beemer Township, Cuming County, Nebraska, a township

Other uses
Beemer (surname)

Slang
BMW manufactured motorcycles and cars
IBM employee

See also
 Beamer (disambiguation)
 Bimmer (disambiguation)